Makar is a town in Bardaghat Municipality in Nawalparasi District in the Lumbini Zone of southern Nepal. The municipality was established on 18 May 2014 by merging existing Makar and Panchanagar VDCs. At the time of the 1991 Nepal census it had a population of 16,206 people living in 2780 individual households.

References

Populated places in Parasi District